The 2003 Liberty Bowl was a college football postseason bowl game played on December 31, 2003, in Memphis, Tennessee. The 45th edition of the Liberty Bowl was a matchup between the Utah Utes and the Southern Miss Golden Eagles. The game was sponsored by the Axa Equitable Life Insurance Company and was branded as the AXA Liberty Bowl. Played in front of 55,989 fans, Utah shutout Southern Miss, 17–0.

References

Liberty Bowl
Liberty Bowl
Utah Utes football bowl games
Southern Miss Golden Eagles football bowl games
December 2003 sports events in the United States
2003 in sports in Tennessee